Telêmaco Borba is a municipality in the state of Paraná in the Southern Region of Brazil.

Telêmaco Borba is known as the "capital of paper" (Capital do Papel) and "capital of wood" (Capital da Madeira) due to the importance of paper and wood production to the local economy, with reforestation for growing pine and eucalyptus that reaches 90% of the agricultural area of the municipality.

City
Telêmaco Borba is the second largest city in Campos Gerais, it had a population of 79,792 in 2020, according to the estimate. Telêmaco Borba is highly urbanised, since only 2,400 residents live in the countryside.

The city was founded because of Klabin Papel e Celulose Industry in the early 1940s. Their factory is the largest producer, exporter and recycler of paper in Brazil.

Today, the city is the 6th largest Industrial Center in Paraná, thanks to paper/lumber sector. That's why the city is the "Paper and Timber Capital". Telêmaco Borba is a national reference in this sector, and with an industrial park that holds 80 companies with diversified activities. Is also an important regional center in many areas, among them, health and education.

History

With the installation of Klabin Industries in Tibagi, encampments arose as Harmonia, Lagoa, Antas, Maua, Mandaçaia, Miranda, Mirandinha. Klabin later bought the land on the left bank of the Tibagi River, the facilities front of Paper Mill and Pulp. Klabin, created the Cia. Territorial Tibagi Valley, which was responsible for urban development and subdivision of land.

The new residents, the vast majority of employees Klabin, started calling the town of New Town. The New Town was an early development than on July 25, 1960 signed by the governor Moyses Lupion, was elevated to a municipality under the name of Telêmaco Borba, with territory taken from the municipality of Tibagi.

However, the city was never even installed, since the Legislative Assembly of the State of Paraná, revoked item IV of article 1 of Law No. 4245, of July 25, 1960 and therefore was extinguished municipality of Telêmaco Borba, returning to the status of mere district with territory belonging to the municipality of Tibagi again, and resuming its former name of New Town.

By State Law No. 4,445, of October 16, 1961, the Administrative District of New Town was created in the municipality of Tibagi. On July 5, 1963, by State Law No. 4738, signed by the governor Ney Aminthas de Barros Braga, the district was elevated to municipality emancipated, with territory taken from the municipality of Tibagy, but with the name changed again to definitely Telêmaco Borba. The county name is a tribute to Colonel Telêmaco Augusto Enéas Morosini Borba.

Geography

Hydrography

 Alegre River
 Das Antas River (Tibagi River)
 Faisqueira River
 Harmonia River
 Imbaú River
 Imbaúzinho River
 Quebra-perna River
 Tibagi River

Neighbourhoods

 Alto das Oliveiras
 Nossa Senhora de Fátima
 Nossa Senhora do Perpétuo Socorro
 Macopa
 Socomim
 Triângulo

Tourism

 Air tram Telemaco Borba (Cable Car)
 Harmonia Grove
 Municipal Environmental Park Pedro Cortez
 Municipal Tibagi River Park
 Samuel Klabin Ecological Park
 Luba Klabin Square (Praça dos Pinheiros)
 Square Dr. Horacio Klabin
 Interpretation Centre of Nature Frans Krajcbeg
 Craftsman House
 Quail White Sulfurosa Water Supply
 Catholic Church Nossa Senhora do Perpétuo Socorro
 Municipal Museum of Telemaco Borba
 Museum of Fauna and Flora
 Lake of the House of Culture Square
 Mandaçaia pond
 Mandaçaia cave 
 Conceição of the jump
 Mauá Plant Dam

Transportation
The city is served by Telêmaco Borba Airport.

Highways
 PR-160: Imbaú–Telêmaco Borba and Telêmaco Borba–Curiúva
 PR-340: Tibagi–Telêmaco Borba and Telêmaco Borba–Ortigueira
 PR-239: Ventania–Telêmaco Borba (Lagoa)
 BR-153: Tibagi–Ventania

Education

 Paraná Federal Institute of Education, Science and Technology (IFPR):  Instituto Federal de Educação, Ciência e Tecnologia do Paraná: campus of Telêmaco Borba
 Ponta Grossa State University (UEPG) (Pt: Universidade Estadual de Ponta Grossa): campus of Telêmaco Borba
 Universidade Anhanguera (Uniderp): campus universitário of Telêmaco Borba
 Faculdade de Telêmaco Borba (Fateb): campus Carlos Hugo Wolff Von Graffen

Notable people
Thiago Kosloski, footballer
Dayenne Mesquita, actress

See also
 Klabin
 List of municipalities in Paraná

References

External links
Official homepage (in Portuguese)